Ľudmila Podjavorinská was a pen name used by Ľudmila Riznerová (26 April 1872 – 2 March 1951), a Slovak writer considered to be the first important woman poet for her country but best known for her children's books. She wrote under a number of different pen names, including Božena, Damascena, Ľ. Šeršelínová, Ľ. Špirifangulínová, Ľudka and Ľudmila.

The daughter of Karol Rizner, a teacher, she was born in the village of Bzince pod Javorinou. Her uncle Ľudovít Rizner encouraged her to submit her first writing to newspapers for publication. Podjavorinská had three contemporary women writers as mentors: Terézia Vansová, Elena Maróthy-Šoltésová and Božena Slančíková. She contributed to various Slovak periodicals and translated Russian poetry into Slovak.

She stayed in her home town until 1910, when she moved to Nové Mesto nad Váhom. For a short time around 1918, she was an official for the district Red Cross. Podjavorinská was a member of Živena, the first women's organization in Slovakia. In 1947, she was named a National Artist for Czechoslovakia.

Podjavorinská died in Nové Mesto nad Váhom at the age of 78.

A minor planet was named Podjavorinská in her honour.

Selected works 
 Z vesny života ("From life's spring"), poetry (1895)
 V otroctve ("In slavery"), novel (1905)
 Žena ("Woman"), novel (1909)
 Kytka veršov pre slovenské dietky ("A bouquet of poems for Slovak children"), children's poetry (1920)
 Balady ("Ballads"), poetry (1930)
 Veršíky pre maličkých ("Verses for little ones"), children's poetry (1930)
 Medový hrniec ("Pot of honey"), children's poetry (1930)
 Baránok boží ("Lamb of God"), children's prose (1932)
 Klásky ("Ears of grain"), children's poetry (1947)

References 

1872 births
1951 deaths
19th-century Slovak writers
20th-century Slovak writers
Slovak children's writers
Slovak poets
Slovak novelists
Slovak translators
Slovak women children's writers
Slovak women poets
Slovak women novelists
19th-century pseudonymous writers
20th-century pseudonymous writers
Pseudonymous women writers
People from Nové Mesto nad Váhom District